Demetrius Flannigan-Fowles (born September 4, 1996) is an American football outside linebacker for the San Francisco 49ers of the National Football League (NFL). He played college football at Arizona.

College career
Flannigan-Fowles played for the Arizona Wildcats for four seasons. He finished his collegiate career with 243 tackles, 10 tackles for loss, three forced fumbles, and two fumble recoveries with 22 passes defended and six interceptions in 50 games played.

Professional career
Flannigan-Fowles was signed by the San Francisco 49ers as an undrafted free agent on May 3, 2019. He was waived on August 31, 2019, during final roster cuts but was re-signed to San Francisco's practice squad the following day. Flannigan-Fowles was placed on the practice squad injured list on December 10, 2019. He signed a futures/reserve contract with the 49ers on February 5, 2020, and made the active roster out of training camp in 2020. In 2020 Flannigan-Fowles played in 11 games, mostly on special teams, with one started and finished the season with nine total tackles.

On March 11, 2022, Flannigan-Fowles signed a one-year extension with the 49ers.

On March 16, 2023, Flannigan-Fowles signed a one-year extension with the 49ers.

References

External links
Arizona Wildcats bio
San Francisco 49ers bio

Living people
Players of American football from Arizona
People from Tucson, Arizona
American football linebackers
San Francisco 49ers players
Arizona Wildcats football players
1996 births